This is a list of employees of The Irish Times, past and present.

Editors
 Dr. George Ferdinand Shaw (1859)
 Rev. George Bomford Wheeler (1859–77)
 James Scott (1877–99)
 William Algernon Locker (1901–7)
 John Edward Healy (1907–34)
 R. M. "Bertie" Smyllie (1934–54)
 Alec Newman (1954–61)
 Alan Montgomery (1961–63)
 Douglas Gageby (1963–74 and 1977–86)
 Fergus Pyle (1974–77)
 Conor Brady (1986–2002)
 Geraldine Kennedy (2002–11)
 Kevin O'Sullivan (2011–2017)
 Paul O'Neill (2017–present)

Current staff

News and Current Affairs, Columnists
 Vincent Browne, columnist
 Stephen Collins, Chief Political Correspondent
 Garret FitzGerald, columnist
 Róisín Ingle, features editor, columnist
 Karlin Lillington, technology and related business, privacy and culture
 Miriam Lord, political sketch writer
 Lara Marlowe, U.S. Correspondent
 Fintan O'Toole, columnist (also serves as Assistant Editor)

Sport
 Emmet Malone, Football Correspondent
 Ian O'Riordain, Athletics Correspondent
 Philip Reid, Golf Correspondent
 Gerry Thornley, Rugby Correspondent

Critics
 Eileen Battersby, literary critic
 Jim Carroll, music critic
 Donald Clarke, film critic
 Quentin Fottrell, radio critic
 Hugh Linehan

Cartoonist
 Martyn Turner

Former staff
 Charles Acton, music critic (1956–1987)
 John Banville, sub editor and literary editor
 Maeve Binchy
 Mark Brennock, chief political correspondent
 Sarah Carey, former columnist, sacked in 2011
 Joe Carroll
 Myles na gCopaleen, satirical columnist
 Michael Dwyer (journalist), film critic
 Donal Foley, satirical columnist
 Paul Gillespie, foreign editor
 John Healy, political commentator
 Mary Holland, Northern Ireland correspondent
 Tom Humphries, columnist
 Seamus Martin, international editor, editor of Electronic Publications, features editor, Moscow correspondent, South Africa correspondent
 Kevin Myers, columnist
 Gerry Noone, former sports editor
 Conor O'Clery, foreign correspondent in Beijing, London, Moscow, New York City and Washington, D.C.
 Fergus Pyle, Northern Ireland editor
 Arthur Quinlan, western correspondent
 Paul Tansey, economics editor
 Terence de Vere White, literary editor
 John Waters
 Maev-Ann Wren, business features editor, economics editor, senior newspaper editor

References

+